King James Bible: The Book That Changed the World or KJB: The Book That Changed the World is a 2011 Lionsgate direct-to-video production in which John Rhys-Davies leads viewers on a half-documentary, half theatrical exploration of the socio-political, religious, and historical background and roots for both James I of England and for the King James Version of the Bible which was published four hundred years prior to the events portrayed in the self-same documentary film.

During the production, Rhys-Davies takes viewers through libraries, churches, castles, and other settings that work into the story.

The documentary won the Epiphany Prize for Inspiring Television at the 2012 Movieguide Awards.

Notable credits
 Produced and Directed by Norman Stone
 Written by Murray Watts
 Presented by John Rhys-Davies
 Paola Dionisotti as Elizabeth I of England 
 Simon Gregor as Sir Robert Cecil
 Andrew Rothney as James I of England
 David Fleeshman as Bishop Bancroft

References

External links
 
 The King James Bible Part 1 | The Old Testament
 The King James Bible Part 2 | The New Testament 
 Interview with John Rhys-Davies http://www.beliefnet.com/columnists/moviemom/2011/04/interview-john-rhys-davies-of.html

2011 direct-to-video films
Documentary films about the Bible
2011 films
British docufiction films
2010s British films